The 1994 Furman Paladins football team was an American football team that represented Furman University as a member of the Southern Conference (SoCon) during the 1994 NCAA Division I-AA football season. In their first year under head coach Bobby Johnson, the Paladins compiled an overall record of 3–8, with a mark of 2–6 in conference play, finishing tied for sixth in the SoCon.

Schedule

References

Furman
Furman Paladins football seasons
Furman Paladins football